Abbé Jacques Testu de Belval (c. 1626, Paris – June 1706) was a French ecclesiastic and poet. Best known for his light poetry, he was also a preacher, translator and king's almoner. He was linked with Madame de Sévigné, Madame de Coulanges, Madame de Brancas, Madame de Schomberg, Madame de La Fayette and Marie-Madeleine de Rochechouart, abbess of Fontevrault Abbey. He was elected to the Académie française in 1665 and received in May that year.

References

Graffin Robert, Jacques testu abbé de belval, membre de l'Académie française 1626-1706.

External links
  Académie française

Translators to French
17th-century French poets
17th-century French male writers
1626 births
1706 deaths
French male poets
17th-century French translators